The San Ysidro Ranch is a luxury resort located in the Montecito foothills of the Santa Ynez Mountains. Originally deeded with the Presidio by Charles III of Spain, the San Ysidro Ranch exchanged hands, changing from a Mission farm, to a Citrus Ranch, to its current role as a hotel acquired by Ty Warner in 2000.

History 
The San Ysidro Ranch was named by the Franciscan friars who occupied the land after Saint Isidore, the patron saint of farmers and agriculture, often depicted with a plow, angel and oxen.

Originally part of a land grant in 1769 by the Charles III of Spain, the Ranch was fully deeded with the Presidio in 1780, serving as a sanctuary for Franciscan friars in the late 1700s. In 1828 the Mission Padres built the Old Adobe and began to farm the land, until it passed through the hands of the mission to become part of the municipal land of the state of California in 1864.

Subsequently, the ranch was sold to Harleigh Johnston and Taylor Goodrich in 1883, by Col. Bradbury Dinsmore.

The San Ysidro Citrus Ranch harvested an average of 300,000 oranges and 100,000 lemons annually. In 1889, a large sandstone packing house was built for the citrus production.

In 1892, a ranch house was built that would become The Hacienda, and plans were made for a small hotel. During this time the hotel expanded to accommodate parties, lunch and dinners. The fruit company remained a prominent part of the operation.

By 1912, the ranch hosted Winston Churchill and his family for the winter months.

After the depression, the Johnston’s sold the hotel to Hollywood actor Ronald Colman and hotelier and former Senator Alvin Carl Weingand, who transformed the ranch into a venue for celebrities; known for its setting, service and guest privacy. Guests over the years range from Audrey Hepburn, Lucille Ball, Bing Crosby and Groucho Marx to Winston Churchill, John Galsworthy, Somerset Maugham and Sinclair Lewis. Vivien Leigh and Laurence Olivier were married at the ranch. John F. Kennedy and Jacqueline honeymooned there as well.  Following Colman's death in 1958 and the death of Weingand's first wife, Beverly, Senator Weingand's wife, Lou Hyland Weingand purchased their shares and became co-owner.

In 1976, hoteliers Jim and Susie Lavenson purchased the ranch from Weingand. Jim Lavenson had been an advertising executive and president of New York City's Plaza Hotel, before buying the property.

Entrepreneur Ty Warner acquired the ranch in 2000 and made it part of the Ty Warner Hotels & Resorts, LLC. Melissa Etheridge and Linda Wallem wed on the ranch grounds in June 2014.

Half of the ranch was destroyed by a ruptured gas line after a series of mudslides on January 9, 2018.

Facilities 

Awards and Accolades 
Named “America’s Best Hotel” and “World’s #1 Resort” by Forbes Traveller and Travel & Leisure. Since 2014, Stonehouse restaurant has been the recipient of the Wine Spectator Grand Award.

References 

Hotels in California
Montecito, California
Buildings and structures in Santa Barbara, California